Colac can refer to:

 Colac, Victoria, a town in Australia
City of Colac, a former local-government area in Victoria, Australia
Shire of Colac, a former local-government area in Victoria, Australia
Shire of Colac Otway, a current local-government area in Victoria, Australia
 Colac Botanic Gardens, in Colac, Australia
 Colac railway station, in Colac, Australia
 Lake Colac in Victoria, Australia
 Colac (mountain), in the Italian Dolomites
 Colac Bay, New Zealand
 , a ship of the Royal Australian Navy
 Kalach (food), spelled colac in Romania, traditional East Slavic bread, also common in Hungary, Romania, and Serbia